Heather McDonald (born 1959) is an American playwright, director, librettist, and professor.

Early life

Mcdonald is originally a Canadian citizen. She graduated from the University of Florida with a BFA in English. She is an MFA graduate of New York University's Tisch School of the Arts.

Career

Heather McDonald has published eight plays, two screenplays, and a libretto. Her plays have been performed nationally and all over the world.

She has attended the Sundance Institute twice, first as a director, and most recently as a playwright for the 2010 Playwrights Retreat at Ucross.

McDonald has been a regular teacher at the Kennedy Center Intensive at the John F. Kennedy Center for the Performing Arts in Washington, D.C. The program is a two-week session of writing workshops and discussions about the business of playwriting.

George Mason University

McDonald is a full-time professor at George Mason University. Her courses include playwriting workshop, advanced playwriting, the screenplay, and advanced playwriting workshop.

McDonald pioneered the Ten-Minute Play Festival, where students produce, direct, and act in ten-minute plays written by students.

Theater of the First Amendment

Heather McDonald was an artistic associate of the Theater of the First Amendment.

"Since 1990, TFA has produced 44 full productions and numerous staged readings of new work. Our productions have won 12 Helen Hayes Awards (DC’s equivalent of the Tony Awards) out of 37 nominations. Many plays originating at TFA have been published, produced nationally and internationally, televised and broadcast, or recorded as award-winning original soundtrack CDs".

In June 2011, TFA hosted Playwrights in Mind: A National Conversation, a playwrights conference. It was sponsored by the Dramatists Guild and featured many celebrated playwrights, including David Ives, Stephen Schwartz, Mame Hunt, Molly Smith, Christopher Durang, Emily Mann, and Julia Jordon.

Personal life
She resides in Baltimore.

Bibliography

Produced plays
Rain and Darkness: Hitting for the Cycle
Available Light
The Rivers and Ravines
Faulkner's Bicycle
Dream of a Common Language
When Grace Comes In
An Almost Holy Picture
The Two Mary's
Stay

Screenplays
Rocket 88
Walking After Midnight

Opera
The End of the Affair (libretto)

References

American librettists
American dramatists and playwrights
American theatre directors
Women theatre directors
Florida State University alumni
Place of birth missing (living people)
George Mason University faculty
Living people
Tisch School of the Arts alumni
Women librettists
1959 births